Iberian moths represent about 4,454 different types of moths. The moths (mostly nocturnal) and butterflies (mostly diurnal) together make up the taxonomic order Lepidoptera.

This is a list of moth species which have been recorded in Portugal, Spain and Gibraltar (together forming the Iberian Peninsula). This list also includes species found on the Balearic Islands.

Peleopodidae
Carcina quercana (Fabricius, 1775)

Plutellidae
Eidophasia syenitella Herrich-Schäffer, 1854
Plutella xylostella (Linnaeus, 1758)
Plutella porrectella (Linnaeus, 1758)
Rhigognostis annulatella (Curtis, 1832)
Rhigognostis hufnagelii (Zeller, 1839)
Rhigognostis incarnatella (Steudel, 1873)

Praydidae
Distagmos ledereri Herrich-Schäffer, 1854
Prays citri (Milliere, 1873)
Prays fraxinella (Bjerkander, 1784)
Prays oleae (Bernard, 1788)

Prodoxidae
Lampronia fuscatella (Tengstrom, 1848)
Lampronia morosa Zeller, 1852
Lampronia pubicornis (Haworth, 1828)

Psychidae
Acanthopsyche atra (Linnaeus, 1767)
Apterona crenulella (Bruand, 1853)
Apterona gracilis (Ad. Speyer, 1886)
Apterona helicoidella (Vallot, 1827)
Apterona nylanderi (Wehrli, 1927)
Bankesia conspurcatella (Zeller, 1850)
Bijugis bombycella (Denis & Schiffermuller, 1775)
Bijugis pectinella (Denis & Schiffermuller, 1775)
Brevantennia pinkeri Sieder, 1964
Canephora hirsuta (Poda, 1761)
Dahlica larella (Chretien, 1906)
Dahlica rianella Hattenschwiler, 1981
Dahlica triquetrella (Hübner, 1813)
Diplodoma laichartingella Goeze, 1783
Dissoctena albidella Rebel, 1902
Dissoctena granigerella Staudinger, 1859
Eotaleporia lusitaniella Amsel, 1955
Epichnopterix plumella (Denis & Schiffermuller, 1775)
Epichnopterix sieboldi (Reutti, 1853)
Eumasia brunella Hattenschwiler, 1996
Eumasia parietariella (Heydenreich, 1851)
Luffia lapidella (Goeze, 1783)
Narycia astrella (Herrich-Schäffer, 1851)
Narycia duplicella (Goeze, 1783)
Oiketicoides eganai (Agenjo, 1962)
Oiketicoides febretta (Boyer de Fonscolombe, 1835)
Oiketicoides tedaldii (Heylaerts, 1881)
Oreopsyche tenella (Ad. Speyer, 1862)
Pachythelia villosella (Ochsenheimer, 1810)
Penestoglossa dardoinella (Milliere, 1863)
Penestoglossa pyrenaella Herrmann, 2006
Phalacropterix calberlae (Heylaerts, 1890)
Phalacropterix fritschi Hattenschwiler, 2003
Phalacropterix graminifera (Fourcroy, 1785)
Phalacropterix praecellens (Staudinger, 1870)
Placodoma ragonoti (Rebel, 1901)
Pseudobankesia casaella Hattenschwiler, 1994
Pseudobankesia leleupiella Henderickx, 1997
Psyche casta (Pallas, 1767)
Psyche crassiorella Bruand, 1851
Psyche pyrenaea (Bourgogne, 1961)
Psychidea nudella (Ochsenheimer, 1810)
Ptilocephala agrostidis (Schrank, 1802)
Ptilocephala albida (Esper, 1786)
Ptilocephala ardanazi (Agenjo, 1954)
Ptilocephala colossa (A. Bang-Haas, 1907)
Ptilocephala fulminella (Milliere, 1865)
Ptilocephala leschenaulti (Staudinger, 1860)
Ptilocephala lessei (Bourgogne, 1954)
Ptilocephala malvinella (Milliere, 1858)
Ptilocephala matthesi (Bourgogne, 1954)
Ptilocephala melanura (Bourgogne, 1954)
Ptilocephala moncaunella (Chapman, 1903)
Ptilocephala monteiroi (Bourgogne, 1953)
Ptilocephala muscella (Denis & Schiffermuller, 1775)
Ptilocephala piae Hattenschwiler, 1996
Ptilocephala plumifera (Ochsenheimer, 1810)
Ptilocephala pyrenaella (Herrich-Schäffer, 1852)
Ptilocephala sicheliella (Bruand, 1858)
Ptilocephala silphella (Milliere, 1871)
Ptilocephala triaena (Bourgogne, 1940)
Pygmaeotinea crisostomella Amsel, 1957
Rebelia surientella (Bruand, 1858)
Sterrhopterix fusca (Haworth, 1809)
Taleporia improvisella Staudinger, 1859
Taleporia politella (Ochsenheimer, 1816)
Taleporia tubulosa (Retzius, 1783)
Typhonia ciliaris (Ochsenheimer, 1810)

Pterolonchidae
Pterolonche gozmaniella Vives, 1984
Pterolonche lutescentella Chretien, 1922
Pterolonche pulverulenta Zeller, 1847
Pterolonche albescens Zeller, 1847
Pterolonche inspersa Staudinger, 1859

Pterophoridae
Adaina microdactyla (Hübner, 1813)
Agdistis adactyla (Hübner, 1819)
Agdistis bennetii (Curtis, 1833)
Agdistis betica Arenberger, 1978
Agdistis bifurcatus Agenjo, 1952
Agdistis espunae Arenberger, 1978
Agdistis frankeniae (Zeller, 1847)
Agdistis gittia Arenberger, 1988
Agdistis glaseri Arenberger, 1978
Agdistis hartigi Arenberger, 1973
Agdistis heydeni (Zeller, 1852)
Agdistis manicata Staudinger, 1859
Agdistis melitensis Amsel, 1954
Agdistis meridionalis (Zeller, 1847)
Agdistis neglecta Arenberger, 1976
Agdistis paralia (Zeller, 1847)
Agdistis pseudocanariensis Arenberger, 1973
Agdistis satanas Milliere, 1875
Agdistis tamaricis (Zeller, 1847)
Amblyptilia acanthadactyla (Hübner, 1813)
Amblyptilia punctidactyla (Haworth, 1811)
Buckleria paludum (Zeller, 1839)
Calyciphora adamas (Constant, 1895)
Calyciphora albodactylus (Fabricius, 1794)
Calyciphora nephelodactyla (Eversmann, 1844)
Capperia bonneaui Bigot, 1987
Capperia britanniodactylus (Gregson, 1867)
Capperia celeusi (Frey, 1886)
Capperia fusca (O. Hofmann, 1898)
Capperia hellenica Adamczewski, 1951
Capperia loranus (Fuchs, 1895)
Capperia maratonica Adamczewski, 1951
Cnaemidophorus rhododactyla (Denis & Schiffermuller, 1775)
Crombrugghia distans (Zeller, 1847)
Crombrugghia kollari (Stainton, 1851)
Crombrugghia laetus (Zeller, 1847)
Crombrugghia tristis (Zeller, 1841)
Emmelina argoteles (Meyrick, 1922)
Emmelina monodactyla (Linnaeus, 1758)
Geina didactyla (Linnaeus, 1758)
Gillmeria pallidactyla (Haworth, 1811)
Gypsochares bigoti Gibeaux & Nel, 1989
Hellinsia carphodactyla (Hübner, 1813)
Hellinsia inulae (Zeller, 1852)
Hellinsia osteodactylus (Zeller, 1841)
Hellinsia pectodactylus (Staudinger, 1859)
Lantanophaga pusillidactylus (Walker, 1864)
Marasmarcha lunaedactyla (Haworth, 1811)
Marasmarcha oxydactylus (Staudinger, 1859)
Megalorhipida leucodactylus (Fabricius, 1794)
Merrifieldia baliodactylus (Zeller, 1841)
Merrifieldia chordodactylus (Staudinger, 1859)
Merrifieldia leucodactyla (Denis & Schiffermuller, 1775)
Merrifieldia malacodactylus (Zeller, 1847)
Merrifieldia tridactyla (Linnaeus, 1758)
Oidaematophorus constanti Ragonot, 1875
Oidaematophorus giganteus (Mann, 1855)
Oidaematophorus lithodactyla (Treitschke, 1833)
Oidaematophorus rogenhoferi (Mann, 1871)
Oxyptilus chrysodactyla (Denis & Schiffermuller, 1775)
Oxyptilus ericetorum (Stainton, 1851)
Oxyptilus parvidactyla (Haworth, 1811)
Oxyptilus pilosellae (Zeller, 1841)
Platyptilia calodactyla (Denis & Schiffermuller, 1775)
Platyptilia farfarellus Zeller, 1867
Platyptilia gonodactyla (Denis & Schiffermuller, 1775)
Platyptilia iberica Rebel, 1935
Platyptilia isodactylus (Zeller, 1852)
Platyptilia tesseradactyla (Linnaeus, 1761)
Procapperia maculatus (Constant, 1865)
Pterophorus ischnodactyla (Treitschke, 1835)
Pterophorus pentadactyla (Linnaeus, 1758)
Puerphorus olbiadactylus (Milliere, 1859)
Stangeia siceliota (Zeller, 1847)
Stenoptilia aridus (Zeller, 1847)
Stenoptilia bipunctidactyla (Scopoli, 1763)
Stenoptilia coprodactylus (Stainton, 1851)
Stenoptilia elkefi Arenberger, 1984
Stenoptilia graphodactyla (Treitschke, 1833)
Stenoptilia gratiolae Gibeaux & Nel, 1990
Stenoptilia hahni Arenberger, 1989
Stenoptilia lutescens (Herrich-Schäffer, 1855)
Stenoptilia millieridactylus (Bruand, 1861)
Stenoptilia mimula Gibeaux, 1985
Stenoptilia nepetellae Bigot & Picard, 1983
Stenoptilia pelidnodactyla (Stein, 1837)
Stenoptilia pterodactyla (Linnaeus, 1761)
Stenoptilia reisseri Rebel, 1935
Stenoptilia stigmatodactylus (Zeller, 1852)
Stenoptilia zophodactylus (Duponchel, 1840)
Stenoptilodes taprobanes (Felder & Rogenhofer, 1875)
Tabulaephorus punctinervis (Constant, 1885)
Wheeleria raphiodactyla (Rebel, 1901)
Wheeleria spilodactylus (Curtis, 1827)

Pyralidae
Achroia grisella (Fabricius, 1794)
Acrobasis advenella (Zincken, 1818)
Acrobasis bithynella Zeller, 1848
Acrobasis centunculella (Mann, 1859)
Acrobasis consociella (Hübner, 1813)
Acrobasis dulcella (Zeller, 1848)
Acrobasis glaucella Staudinger, 1859
Acrobasis legatea (Haworth, 1811)
Acrobasis marmorea (Haworth, 1811)
Acrobasis obliqua (Zeller, 1847)
Acrobasis obtusella (Hübner, 1796)
Acrobasis porphyrella (Duponchel, 1836)
Acrobasis repandana (Fabricius, 1798)
Acrobasis romanella (Milliere, 1870)
Acrobasis sodalella Zeller, 1848
Acrobasis suavella (Zincken, 1818)
Acrobasis tumidana (Denis & Schiffermuller, 1775)
Acrobasis xanthogramma (Staudinger, 1870)
Aglossa brabanti Ragonot, 1884
Aglossa caprealis (Hübner, 1809)
Aglossa dimidiatus (Haworth, 1809)
Aglossa pinguinalis (Linnaeus, 1758)
Alophia combustella (Herrich-Schäffer, 1855)
Amphithrix sublineatella (Staudinger, 1859)
Ancylodes dealbatella (Erschoff, 1874)
Ancylodes pallens Ragonot, 1887
Ancylosis albidella Ragonot, 1888
Ancylosis arenosella (Staudinger, 1859)
Ancylosis brunneella (Chretien, 1911)
Ancylosis calcariella (Ragonot, 1901)
Ancylosis cinnamomella (Duponchel, 1836)
Ancylosis convexella (Lederer, 1855)
Ancylosis deserticola (Staudinger, 1870)
Ancylosis gracilella Ragonot, 1887
Ancylosis harmoniella (Ragonot, 1887)
Ancylosis imitella Hampson, 1901
Ancylosis maculifera Staudinger, 1870
Ancylosis oblitella (Zeller, 1848)
Ancylosis ochracea (Staudinger, 1870)
Ancylosis pectinatella (Ragonot, 1887)
Ancylosis rhodochrella (Herrich-Schäffer, 1852)
Ancylosis roscidella (Eversmann, 1844)
Ancylosis samaritanella (Zeller, 1867)
Ancylosis sareptalla (Herrich-Schäffer, 1861)
Ancylosis uncinatella (Ragonot, 1890)
Ancylosis versicolorella (Ragonot, 1887)
Ancylosis xylinella (Staudinger, 1870)
Anerastia lotella (Hübner, 1813)
Aphomia murciella (Zerny, 1914)
Aphomia sabella (Hampson, 1901)
Aphomia sociella (Linnaeus, 1758)
Aphomia unicolor (Staudinger, 1880)
Aphomia zelleri de Joannis, 1932
Apomyelois ceratoniae (Zeller, 1839)
Archiephestia adpiscinella (Chretien, 1911)
Asalebria florella (Mann, 1862)
Asalebria geminella (Eversmann, 1844)
Asalebria pseudoflorella (A. Schmidt, 1934)
Asalebria venustella (Ragonot, 1887)
Asarta aethiopella (Duponchel, 1837)
Asarta albarracinella Leraut & Luquet, 1991
Asartodes monspesulalis (Duponchel, 1834)
Asartodes zapateri (Ragonot, 1882)
Assara conicolella (Constant, 1884)
Bostra obsoletalis (Mann, 1884)
Bradyrrhoa adrianae Asselbergs, 2002
Bradyrrhoa cantenerella (Duponchel, 1837)
Bradyrrhoa luteola (La Harpe, 1860)
Bradyrrhoa marianella Ragonot, 1887
Cadra abstersella (Zeller, 1847)
Cadra calidella (Guenee, 1845)
Cadra cautella (Walker, 1863)
Cadra figulilella (Gregson, 1871)
Cadra furcatella (Herrich-Schäffer, 1849)
Cathayia insularum (Speidel & Schmitz, 1991)
Corcyra cephalonica (Stainton, 1866)
Cremnophila sedakovella (Eversmann, 1851)
Cryptoblabes bistriga (Haworth, 1811)
Cryptoblabes gnidiella (Milliere, 1867)
Delplanqueia dilutella (Denis & Schiffermuller, 1775)
Delplanqueia inscriptella (Duponchel, 1836)
Denticera divisella (Duponchel, 1842)
Dioryctria abietella (Denis & Schiffermuller, 1775)
Dioryctria aulloi Barbey, 1930
Dioryctria mendacella (Staudinger, 1859)
Dioryctria pineae (Staudinger, 1859)
Dioryctria robiniella (Milliere, 1865)
Dioryctria sylvestrella (Ratzeburg, 1840)
Eccopisa effractella Zeller, 1848
Elegia fallax (Staudinger, 1881)
Elegia similella (Zincken, 1818)
Ematheudes punctella (Treitschke, 1833)
Emmalocera anerastica (Snellen, 1879)
Endotricha flammealis (Denis & Schiffermuller, 1775)
Ephestia disparella Hampson, 1901
Ephestia elutella (Hübner, 1796)
Ephestia inquietella Zerny, 1932
Ephestia kuehniella Zeller, 1879
Ephestia mistralella (Milliere, 1874)
Ephestia parasitella Staudinger, 1859
Ephestia unicolorella Staudinger, 1881
Ephestia welseriella (Zeller, 1848)
Epidauria strigosa (Staudinger, 1879)
Epischidia fulvostrigella (Eversmann, 1844)
Epischnia asteris Staudinger, 1870
Epischnia castillella Ragonot, 1894
Epischnia illotella Zeller, 1839
Epischnia leucoloma Herrich-Schäffer, 1849
Epischnia prodromella (Hübner, 1799)
Episcythrastis tabidella (Mann, 1864)
Episcythrastis tetricella (Denis & Schiffermuller, 1775)
Etiella zinckenella (Treitschke, 1832)
Eurhodope cirrigerella (Zincken, 1818)
Eurhodope cruentella (Duponchel, 1843)
Eurhodope incensella (Staudinger, 1859)
Eurhodope rosella (Scopoli, 1763)
Euzophera bigella (Zeller, 1848)
Euzophera cinerosella (Zeller, 1839)
Euzophera fuliginosella (Heinemann, 1865)
Euzophera lunulella (O. Costa, 1836)
Euzophera osseatella (Treitschke, 1832)
Euzophera pinguis (Haworth, 1811)
Euzophera subcribrella Ragonot, 1887
Euzopherodes vapidella (Mann, 1857)
Faveria dionysia (Zeller, 1846)
Galleria mellonella (Linnaeus, 1758)
Glyptoteles leucacrinella Zeller, 1848
Gymnancyla canella (Denis & Schiffermuller, 1775)
Gymnancyla hornigii (Lederer, 1852)
Gymnancyla ruscinonella Ragonot, 1888
Gymnancyla sfakesella Chretien, 1911
Homoeosoma inustella Ragonot, 1884
Homoeosoma nebulella (Denis & Schiffermuller, 1775)
Homoeosoma nevadellum Roesler, 1965
Homoeosoma nimbella (Duponchel, 1837)
Homoeosoma sinuella (Fabricius, 1794)
Homoeosoma soaltheirellum Roesler, 1965
Hypochalcia ahenella (Denis & Schiffermuller, 1775)
Hypochalcia lignella (Hübner, 1796)
Hypotia colchicalis (Herrich-Schäffer, 1851)
Hypotia corticalis (Denis & Schiffermuller, 1775)
Hypotia infulalis Lederer, 1858
Hypotia leucographalis (Hampson, 1900)
Hypotia massilialis (Duponchel, 1832)
Hypotia miegi Ragonot, 1895
Hypotia numidalis (Hampson, 1900)
Hypotia pectinalis (Herrich-Schäffer, 1838)
Hypsopygia costalis (Fabricius, 1775)
Hypsopygia fulvocilialis (Duponchel, 1834)
Hypsopygia glaucinalis (Linnaeus, 1758)
Hypsopygia incarnatalis (Zeller, 1847)
Hypsopygia rubidalis (Denis & Schiffermuller, 1775)
Hypsotropa vulneratella (Zeller, 1847)
Isauria dilucidella (Duponchel, 1836)
Khorassania compositella (Treitschke, 1835)
Laetilia loxogramma (Staudinger, 1870)
Lamoria anella (Denis & Schiffermuller, 1775)
Lamoria jordanis Ragonot, 1901
Loryma egregialis (Herrich-Schäffer, 1838)
Matilella fusca (Haworth, 1811)
Megasis rippertella (Zeller, 1839)
Merulempista cingillella (Zeller, 1846)
Merulempista ragonoti Rothschild, 1913
Merulempista turturella (Zeller, 1848)
Metallostichodes nigrocyanella (Constant, 1865)
Moitrelia boeticella (Ragonot, 1887)
Moitrelia hispanella Staudinger, 1859
Moitrelia italogallicella (Milliere, 1882)
Moitrelia obductella (Zeller, 1839)
Myelois circumvoluta (Fourcroy, 1785)
Myelois fuscicostella Mann, 1861
Nephopterix angustella (Hübner, 1796)
Neurotomia coenulentella (Zeller, 1846)
Niethammeriodes diremptella (Ragonot, 1887)
Niethammeriodes ustella (Ragonot, 1887)
Nyctegretis lineana (Scopoli, 1786)
Nyctegretis ruminella La Harpe, 1860
Oncocera semirubella (Scopoli, 1763)
Oxybia transversella (Duponchel, 1836)
Paramaxillaria amatrix (Zerny, 1927)
Pempelia albariella Zeller, 1839
Pempelia brephiella (Staudinger, 1879)
Pempelia genistella (Duponchel, 1836)
Pempelia palumbella (Denis & Schiffermuller, 1775)
Pempeliella ardosiella (Ragonot, 1887)
Pempeliella enderleini (Rebel, 1934)
Pempeliella malacella (Staudinger, 1870)
Pempeliella ornatella (Denis & Schiffermuller, 1775)
Pempeliella sororiella Zeller, 1839
Phycita coronatella (Guenee, 1845)
Phycita diaphana (Staudinger, 1870)
Phycita poteriella (Zeller, 1846)
Phycita roborella (Denis & Schiffermuller, 1775)
Phycita strigata (Staudinger, 1879)
Phycita torrenti Agenjo, 1962
Phycitodes albatella (Ragonot, 1887)
Phycitodes binaevella (Hübner, 1813)
Phycitodes eliseannae Leraut, 2002
Phycitodes inquinatella (Ragonot, 1887)
Phycitodes lacteella (Rothschild, 1915)
Phycitodes saxicola (Vaughan, 1870)
Phycitodes subcretacella (Ragonot, 1901)
Pima boisduvaliella (Guenee, 1845)
Plodia interpunctella (Hübner, 1813)
Polyochodes stipella Chretien, 1911
Praeepischnia nevadensis (Rebel, 1910)
Pseudacrobasis nankingella Roesler, 1975
Psorosa dahliella (Treitschke, 1832)
Psorosa flavifasciella Hampson, 1901
Psorosa mediterranella Amsel, 1953
Pterothrixidia rufella (Duponchel, 1836)
Pyralis farinalis (Linnaeus, 1758)
Pyralis lienigialis (Zeller, 1843)
Pyralis regalis Denis & Schiffermuller, 1775
Raphimetopus ablutella (Zeller, 1839)
Rhodophaea formosa (Haworth, 1811)
Salebriopsis albicilla (Herrich-Schäffer, 1849)
Sciota rhenella (Zincken, 1818)
Sciota rungsi Leraut, 2002
Seeboldia korgosella Ragonot, 1887
Selagia argyrella (Denis & Schiffermuller, 1775)
Selagia subochrella (Herrich-Schäffer, 1849)
Seleucia karsholti Vives, 1995
Stanempista schawerdae (Zerny, 1927)
Stemmatophora borgialis (Duponchel, 1832)
Stemmatophora brunnealis (Treitschke, 1829)
Stemmatophora combustalis (Fischer v. Röslerstamm, 1842)
Stemmatophora gadesalis Ragonot, 1882
Stemmatophora gredalis Zerny, 1935
Stemmatophora honestalis (Treitschke, 1829)
Stemmatophora rungsi Leraut, 2000
Stemmatophora syriacalis (Ragonot, 1895)
Stemmatophora vulpecalis Ragonot, 1891
Sudaniola remanella Roesler, 1973
Synaphe antennalis (Fabricius, 1794)
Synaphe bombycalis (Denis & Schiffermuller, 1775)
Synaphe chellalalis (Hampson, 1900)
Synaphe diffidalis (Guenee, 1854)
Synaphe interjunctalis (Guenee, 1849)
Synaphe lorquinalis (Guenee, 1854)
Synaphe moldavica (Esper, 1794)
Synaphe oculatalis (Ragonot, 1885)
Synaphe predotalis (Zerny, 1927)
Synaphe punctalis (Fabricius, 1775)
Tephris cyriella (Erschoff, 1874)
Trachonitis capensis Hampson, 1901
Trachonitis cristella (Denis & Schiffermuller, 1775)
Tsaraphycis mimeticella (Staudinger, 1879)
Valdovecaria bradyrrhoella Zerny, 1927
Valdovecaria hispanicella (Herrich-Schäffer, 1855)
Vitula biviella (Zeller, 1848)
Zophodia grossulariella (Hübner, 1809)

Riodinidae
Hamearis lucina (Linnaeus, 1758)

Saturniidae
Actias isabellae (Graells, 1849)
Aglia tau (Linnaeus, 1758)
Antheraea pernyi (Guerin-Meneville, 1855)
Samia cynthia (Drury, 1773)
Saturnia pavonia (Linnaeus, 1758)
Saturnia pyri (Denis & Schiffermuller, 1775)

Schreckensteiniidae
Schreckensteinia festaliella (Hübner, 1819)

Scythrididae
Apostibes raguae Bengtsson, 1997
Enolmis abenhumeya (Agenjo, 1951)
Enolmis acanthella (Godart, 1824)
Enolmis bimerdella (Staudinger, 1859)
Enolmis delicatella (Rebel, 1901)
Enolmis delnoydella Groenen & Schreurs, 2016
Enolmis nevadensis Passerin d'Entreves, 1997
Enolmis seeboldiella (Agenjo, 1951)
Enolmis sierraenevadae Passerin d'Entreves, 1997
Enolmis userai (Agenjo, 1962)
Enolmis vivesi Bengtsson & Passerin d'Entreves, 1987
Episcythris triangulella (Ragonot, 1874)
Eretmocera medinella (Staudinger, 1859)
Scythris acipenserella K. & T. Nupponen, 2000
Scythris aenea Passerin d'Entreves, 1984
Scythris amphonycella (Geyer, 1836)
Scythris andersi Bengtsson, 1991
Scythris anomaloptera (Staudinger, 1880)
Scythris arenbergeri Passerin d'Entreves, 1986
Scythris bazaensis Bengtsson, 1997
Scythris bengtbengtssoni Vives, 1994
Scythris binotiferella (Ragonot, 1880)
Scythris bornicensis Jackh, 1977
Scythris braschiella (O. Hofmann, 1897)
Scythris cicadella (Zeller, 1839)
Scythris cistorum (Milliere, 1876)
Scythris clavella (Zeller, 1855)
Scythris corleyi Bengtsson, 1997
Scythris crassiuscula (Herrich-Schäffer, 1855)
Scythris cupreella (Staudinger, 1859)
Scythris cuspidella (Denis & Schiffermuller, 1775)
Scythris disparella (Tengstrom, 1848)
Scythris dissimilella (Herrich-Schäffer, 1855)
Scythris dorycniella (Milliere, 1861)
Scythris elegantella (D. Lucas, 1955)
Scythris empetrella Karsholt & Nielsen, 1976
Scythris ericetella (Heinemann, 1872)
Scythris ericivorella (Ragonot, 1880)
Scythris fallacella (Schlager, 1847)
Scythris fasciatella (Ragonot, 1880)
Scythris flavilaterella (Fuchs, 1886)
Scythris fuscoaenea (Haworth, 1828)
Scythris garciapitai Vives, 2001
Scythris gladiella Nupponen & Nupponen, 2004
Scythris grandipennis (Haworth, 1828)
Scythris gratiosella Jackh, 1978
Scythris gravatella (Zeller, 1847)
Scythris iagella Chretien, 1925
Scythris iberica Jackh, 1978
Scythris imperiella Jackh, 1978
Scythris inertella (Zeller, 1855)
Scythris insulella (Staudinger, 1859)
Scythris karinae Bengtsson, 1991
Scythris knochella (Fabricius, 1794)
Scythris lafauryi Passerin d'Entreves, 1986
Scythris lampyrella (Constant, 1865)
Scythris langohri Passerin d'Entreves, 1990
Scythris latilineella K. Nupponen, 2013
Scythris lempkei Bengtsson & Langohr, 1989
Scythris levantina Passerin d'Entreves & Vives, 1990
Scythris lhommei Bengtsson & Passerin d'Entreves, 1988
Scythris limbella (Fabricius, 1775)
Scythris lobella K. Nupponen, 2013
Scythris mariannae Bengtsson, 1991
Scythris martini Bengtsson, 1991
Scythris minima Bengtsson, 1997
Scythris moldavicella Caradja, 1905
Scythris mus Walsingham, 1898
Scythris nevadensis Passerin d'Entreves, 1990
Scythris nieukerkeni Bengtsson, 1989
Scythris obscurella (Scopoli, 1763)
Scythris parafuscoaenea Bengtsson, 1991
Scythris picaepennis (Haworth, 1828)
Scythris pilella Bengtsson, 1991
Scythris popescugorji Passerin d'Entreves, 1984
Scythris potentillella (Zeller, 1847)
Scythris productella (Zeller, 1839)
Scythris pseudolocustella Passerin d'Entreves & Vives, 1990
Scythris pulicella (Staudinger, 1859)
Scythris ridiculella Caradja, 1920
Scythris rondaensis Bengtsson, 1997
Scythris rubioi Agenjo, 1962
Scythris saarelai K. & T. Nupponen, 1999
Scythris salviella Meess, 1910
Scythris sappadensis Bengtsson, 1992
Scythris scipionella (Staudinger, 1859)
Scythris scopolella (Linnaeus, 1767)
Scythris scorpionella Jackh, 1977
Scythris seliniella (Zeller, 1839)
Scythris siccella (Zeller, 1839)
Scythris staudingeri Jackh, 1978
Scythris subfasciata (Staudinger, 1880)
Scythris subseliniella (Heinemann, 1876)
Scythris tabidella (Herrich-Schäffer, 1855)
Scythris tenuivittella (Stainton, 1867)
Scythris tergestinella (Zeller, 1855)
Scythris traugotti Bengtsson, 1991
Scythris tributella (Zeller, 1847)
Scythris vartianae Kasy, 1962
Scythris veletae Passerin d'Entreves, 1990
Scythris ventosella Chretien, 1907
Scythris villari Agenjo, 1971
Scythris vittella (O. Costa, 1834)
Scythris xanthopygella (Staudinger, 1859)

Sesiidae
Bembecia abromeiti Kallies & Riefenstahl, 2000
Bembecia albanensis (Rebel, 1918)
Bembecia fibigeri Z. Lastuvka & A. Lastuvka, 1994
Bembecia himmighoffeni (Staudinger, 1866)
Bembecia hymenopteriformis (Bellier, 1860)
Bembecia iberica Spatenka, 1992
Bembecia ichneumoniformis (Denis & Schiffermuller, 1775)
Bembecia psoraleae Bartsch & Bettag, 1997
Bembecia scopigera (Scopoli, 1763)
Bembecia sirphiformis (Lucas, 1849)
Bembecia uroceriformis (Treitschke, 1834)
Chamaesphecia aerifrons (Zeller, 1847)
Chamaesphecia bibioniformis (Esper, 1800)
Chamaesphecia empiformis (Esper, 1783)
Chamaesphecia euceraeformis (Ochsenheimer, 1816)
Chamaesphecia leucopsiformis (Esper, 1800)
Chamaesphecia maurusia Pungeler, 1912
Chamaesphecia mysiniformis (Boisduval, 1840)
Chamaesphecia ramburi (Staudinger, 1866)
Chamaesphecia tenthrediniformis (Denis & Schiffermuller, 1775)
Paranthrene insolitus Le Cerf, 1914
Paranthrene tabaniformis (Rottemburg, 1775)
Pennisetia hylaeiformis (Laspeyres, 1801)
Pyropteron affinis (Staudinger, 1856)
Pyropteron aistleitneri (Spatenka, 1992)
Pyropteron chrysidiformis (Esper, 1782)
Pyropteron doryliformis (Ochsenheimer, 1808)
Pyropteron hispanica (Kallies, 1999)
Pyropteron kautzi (Reisser, 1930)
Pyropteron koschwitzi (Spatenka, 1992)
Pyropteron leucomelaena (Zeller, 1847)
Pyropteron meriaeformis (Boisduval, 1840)
Pyropteron muscaeformis (Esper, 1783)
Sesia apiformis (Clerck, 1759)
Sesia bembeciformis (Hübner, 1806)
Sesia melanocephala Dalman, 1816
Synanthedon andrenaeformis (Laspeyres, 1801)
Synanthedon codeti (Oberthur, 1881)
Synanthedon conopiformis (Esper, 1782)
Synanthedon cruciati Bettag & Blasius, 2002
Synanthedon culiciformis (Linnaeus, 1758)
Synanthedon formicaeformis (Esper, 1783)
Synanthedon loranthi (Kralicek, 1966)
Synanthedon mesiaeformis (Herrich-Schäffer, 1846)
Synanthedon myopaeformis (Borkhausen, 1789)
Synanthedon scoliaeformis (Borkhausen, 1789)
Synanthedon spheciformis (Denis & Schiffermuller, 1775)
Synanthedon spuleri (Fuchs, 1908)
Synanthedon stomoxiformis (Hübner, 1790)
Synanthedon theryi Le Cerf, 1916
Synanthedon tipuliformis (Clerck, 1759)
Synanthedon vespiformis (Linnaeus, 1761)
Tinthia tineiformis (Esper, 1789)

Somabrachyidae
Somabrachys aegrota (Klug, 1830)

Sphingidae
Acherontia atropos (Linnaeus, 1758)
Agrius convolvuli (Linnaeus, 1758)
Daphnis nerii (Linnaeus, 1758)
Deilephila elpenor (Linnaeus, 1758)
Deilephila porcellus (Linnaeus, 1758)
Hemaris fuciformis (Linnaeus, 1758)
Hemaris tityus (Linnaeus, 1758)
Hippotion celerio (Linnaeus, 1758)
Hippotion osiris (Dalman, 1823)
Hyles dahlii (Geyer, 1828)
Hyles euphorbiae (Linnaeus, 1758)
Hyles gallii (Rottemburg, 1775)
Hyles livornica (Esper, 1780)
Hyles nicaea (de Prunner, 1798)
Laothoe populi (Linnaeus, 1758)
Macroglossum stellatarum (Linnaeus, 1758)
Marumba quercus (Denis & Schiffermuller, 1775)
Mimas tiliae (Linnaeus, 1758)
Polyptychus trisecta (Aurivillius, 1901)
Proserpinus proserpina (Pallas, 1772)
Smerinthus ocellata (Linnaeus, 1758)
Sphinx ligustri Linnaeus, 1758
Sphinx maurorum (Jordan, 1931)

Stathmopodidae
Neomariania partinicensis (Rebel, 1937)
Neomariania rebeli (Walsingham, 1894)
Stathmopoda pedella (Linnaeus, 1761)
Tortilia flavella Chretien, 1908

Thyrididae
Thyris fenestrella (Scopoli, 1763)

Tineidae
Anomalotinea chellalalis (Rebel, 1901)
Anomalotinea cubiculella (Staudinger, 1859)
Anomalotinea liguriella (Milliere, 1879)
Ateliotum hungaricellum Zeller, 1839
Ateliotum insulare (Rebel, 1896)
Ateliotum petrinella (Herrich-Schäffer, 1854)
Cephimallota crassiflavella Bruand, 1851
Cephimallota tunesiella (Zagulajev, 1966)
Ceratobia ratjadae Passerin d'Entreves, 1978
Ceratuncus danubiella (Mann, 1866)
Ceratuncus dzhungaricus Zagulajev, 1971
Crassicornella agenjoi (Petersen, 1957)
Dryadaula heindeli Gaedike & Scholz, 1998
Elatobia fuliginosella (Lienig & Zeller, 1846)
Eudarcia glaseri (Petersen, 1967)
Eudarcia alberti (Amsel, 1957)
Eudarcia leopoldella (O. G. Costa, 1836)
Gaedikeia kokkariensis Sutter, 1998
Infurcitinea albicomella (Stainton, 1851)
Infurcitinea albulella (Rebel, 1935)
Infurcitinea argentimaculella (Stainton, 1849)
Infurcitinea atrifasciella (Staudinger, 1871)
Infurcitinea captans Gozmany, 1960
Infurcitinea finalis Gozmany, 1959
Infurcitinea frustigerella (Walsingham, 1907)
Infurcitinea gaedikei Baldizzone, 1984
Infurcitinea italica (Amsel, 1954)
Infurcitinea karadaghica Zagulajev, 1979
Infurcitinea marcunella (Rebel, 1910)
Infurcitinea minuscula Gozmany, 1960
Infurcitinea monteiroi Amsel, 1957
Infurcitinea parentii Petersen, 1964
Infurcitinea peterseni Baldizzone, 1984
Infurcitinea roesslerella (Heyden, 1865)
Infurcitinea rumelicella (Rebel, 1903)
Infurcitinea vartianae Petersen, 1962
Ischnoscia borreonella (Milliere, 1874)
Lichenotinea pustulatella (Zeller, 1852)
Monopis crocicapitella (Clemens, 1859)
Monopis imella (Hübner, 1813)
Monopis laevigella (Denis & Schiffermuller, 1775)
Monopis monachella (Hübner, 1796)
Monopis nigricantella (Milliere, 1872)
Monopis obviella (Denis & Schiffermuller, 1775)
Monopis weaverella (Scott, 1858)
Morophaga choragella (Denis & Schiffermuller, 1775)
Morophaga morella (Duponchel, 1838)
Myrmecozela ataxella (Chretien, 1905)
Myrmecozela diacona Walsingham, 1907
Myrmecozela lambessella Rebel, 1901
Myrmecozela ochraceella (Tengstrom, 1848)
Myrmecozela sordidella Zagulajev, 1975
Nemapogon agenjoi Petersen, 1959
Nemapogon clematella (Fabricius, 1781)
Nemapogon cloacella (Haworth, 1828)
Nemapogon granella (Linnaeus, 1758)
Nemapogon hispanica Petersen & Gaedike, 1992
Nemapogon inconditella (Lucas, 1956)
Nemapogon nevadella (Caradja, 1920)
Nemapogon nigralbella (Zeller, 1839)
Nemapogon ruricolella (Stainton, 1849)
Nemapogon variatella (Clemens, 1859)
Neurothaumasia ankerella (Mann, 1867)
Neurothaumasia ragusaella (Wocke, 1889)
Niditinea fuscella (Linnaeus, 1758)
Niditinea truncicolella (Tengstrom, 1848)
Novotinea albarracinella Petersen, 1967
Novotinea andalusiella Petersen, 1964
Novotinea muricolella (Fuchs, 1879)
Oinophila v-flava (Haworth, 1828)
Opogona omoscopa (Meyrick, 1893)
Opogona sacchari (Bojer, 1856)
Pachyarthra mediterranea (Baker, 1894)
Phereoeca lodli Vives, 2001
Proterospastis merdella (Zeller, 1847)
Proterospastis quadruplella (Caradja, 1920)
Reisserita chrysopterella (Herrich-Schäffer, 1854)
Reisserita haasi (Rebel, 1901)
Reisserita parva Petersen & Gaedike, 1979
Reisserita zernyi Petersen, 1957
Rhodobates friedeli Petersen, 1987
Rhodobates unicolor (Staudinger, 1870)
Stenoptinea cyaneimarmorella (Milliere, 1854)
Tenaga nigripunctella (Haworth, 1828)
Tenaga rhenania (Petersen, 1962)
Tinea basifasciella Ragonot, 1895
Tinea columbariella Wocke, 1877
Tinea dubiella Stainton, 1859
Tinea flavescentella Haworth, 1828
Tinea flavofimbriella (Chretien, 1925)
Tinea lanella Pierce & Metcalfe, 1934
Tinea messalina Robinson, 1979
Tinea murariella Staudinger, 1859
Tinea pellionella Linnaeus, 1758
Tinea semifulvella Haworth, 1828
Tinea translucens Meyrick, 1917
Tinea trinotella Thunberg, 1794
Tineola bisselliella (Hummel, 1823)
Triaxomasia caprimulgella (Stainton, 1851)
Triaxomera parasitella (Hübner, 1796)
Trichophaga bipartitella (Ragonot, 1892)
Trichophaga tapetzella (Linnaeus, 1758)

Tischeriidae
Coptotriche angusticollella (Duponchel, 1843)
Coptotriche berberella (De Prins, 1984)
Coptotriche marginea (Haworth, 1828)
Tischeria decidua Wocke, 1876
Tischeria ekebladella (Bjerkander, 1795)
Tischeria ekebladoides Puplesis & Diskus, 2003

Tortricidae
Acleris bergmanniana (Linnaeus, 1758)
Acleris comariana (Lienig & Zeller, 1846)
Acleris cristana (Denis & Schiffermuller, 1775)
Acleris emargana (Fabricius, 1775)
Acleris ferrugana (Denis & Schiffermuller, 1775)
Acleris forsskaleana (Linnaeus, 1758)
Acleris hastiana (Linnaeus, 1758)
Acleris holmiana (Linnaeus, 1758)
Acleris hyemana (Haworth, 1811)
Acleris kochiella (Goeze, 1783)
Acleris laterana (Fabricius, 1794)
Acleris lipsiana (Denis & Schiffermuller, 1775)
Acleris literana (Linnaeus, 1758)
Acleris logiana (Clerck, 1759)
Acleris notana (Donovan, 1806)
Acleris permutana (Duponchel, 1836)
Acleris quercinana (Zeller, 1849)
Acleris rhombana (Denis & Schiffermuller, 1775)
Acleris rufana (Denis & Schiffermuller, 1775)
Acleris schalleriana (Linnaeus, 1761)
Acleris sparsana (Denis & Schiffermuller, 1775)
Acleris undulana (Walsingham, 1900)
Acleris variegana (Denis & Schiffermuller, 1775)
Acroclita subsequana (Herrich-Schäffer, 1851)
Adoxophyes orana (Fischer v. Röslerstamm, 1834)
Aethes ardezana (Muller-Rutz, 1922)
Aethes beatricella (Walsingham, 1898)
Aethes bilbaensis (Rossler, 1877)
Aethes deaurana (Peyerimhoff, 1877)
Aethes decimana (Denis & Schiffermuller, 1775)
Aethes dilucidana (Stephens, 1852)
Aethes fennicana (M. Hering, 1924)
Aethes flagellana (Duponchel, 1836)
Aethes francillana (Fabricius, 1794)
Aethes hartmanniana (Clerck, 1759)
Aethes kindermanniana (Treitschke, 1830)
Aethes languidana (Mann, 1855)
Aethes margaritana (Haworth, 1811)
Aethes margarotana (Duponchel, 1836)
Aethes mauritanica (Walsingham, 1898)
Aethes moribundana (Staudinger, 1859)
Aethes perfidana (Kennel, 1900)
Aethes piercei Obraztsov, 1952
Aethes rubiginana (Walsingham, 1903)
Aethes rutilana (Hübner, 1817)
Aethes sanguinana (Treitschke, 1830)
Aethes scalana (Zerny, 1927)
Aethes smeathmanniana (Fabricius, 1781)
Aethes tesserana (Denis & Schiffermuller, 1775)
Aethes tornella (Walsingham, 1898)
Aethes triangulana (Treitschke, 1835)
Aethes williana (Brahm, 1791)
Agapeta angelana (Kennel, 1919)
Agapeta hamana (Linnaeus, 1758)
Agapeta zoegana (Linnaeus, 1767)
Aleimma loeflingiana (Linnaeus, 1758)
Ancylis achatana (Denis & Schiffermuller, 1775)
Ancylis apicella (Denis & Schiffermuller, 1775)
Ancylis badiana (Denis & Schiffermuller, 1775)
Ancylis comptana (Frolich, 1828)
Ancylis geminana (Donovan, 1806)
Ancylis myrtillana (Treitschke, 1830)
Ancylis obtusana (Haworth, 1811)
Ancylis selenana (Guenee, 1845)
Ancylis sparulana (Staudinger, 1859)
Ancylis unculana (Haworth, 1811)
Ancylis unguicella (Linnaeus, 1758)
Aneuxanthis locupletana (Hübner, 1819)
Aphelia viburniana (Denis & Schiffermuller, 1775)
Aphelia paleana (Hübner, 1793)
Aphelia peramplana (Hübner, 1825)
Apotomis betuletana (Haworth, 1811)
Apotomis turbidana Hübner, 1825
Archips crataegana (Hübner, 1799)
Archips oporana (Linnaeus, 1758)
Archips podana (Scopoli, 1763)
Archips rosana (Linnaeus, 1758)
Archips xylosteana (Linnaeus, 1758)
Argyroploce unedana Baixeras, 2002
Argyrotaenia ljungiana (Thunberg, 1797)
Aterpia anderreggana Guenee, 1845
Avaria hyerana (Milliere, 1858)
Bactra bactrana (Kennel, 1901)
Bactra furfurana (Haworth, 1811)
Bactra lancealana (Hübner, 1799)
Bactra robustana (Christoph, 1872)
Bactra venosana (Zeller, 1847)
Barbara herrichiana Obraztsov, 1960
Cacoecimorpha pronubana (Hübner, 1799)
Celypha aurofasciana (Haworth, 1811)
Celypha cespitana (Hübner, 1817)
Celypha lacunana (Denis & Schiffermuller, 1775)
Celypha rivulana (Scopoli, 1763)
Celypha rufana (Scopoli, 1763)
Celypha rurestrana (Duponchel, 1843)
Celypha striana (Denis & Schiffermuller, 1775)
Ceratoxanthis iberica Baixeras, 1992
Choristoneura hebenstreitella (Muller, 1764)
Choristoneura lafauryana (Ragonot, 1875)
Clavigesta sylvestrana (Curtis, 1850)
Clepsis agenjoi Obraztsov, 1950
Clepsis consimilana (Hübner, 1817)
Clepsis dumicolana (Zeller, 1847)
Clepsis laetitiae Soria, 1997
Clepsis neglectana (Herrich-Schäffer, 1851)
Clepsis pallidana (Fabricius, 1776)
Clepsis peritana (Clemens, 1860)
Clepsis rogana (Guenee, 1845)
Clepsis rurinana (Linnaeus, 1758)
Clepsis senecionana (Hübner, 1819)
Clepsis siciliana (Ragonot, 1894)
Clepsis spectrana (Treitschke, 1830)
Clepsis steineriana (Hübner, 1799)
Clepsis unicolorana (Duponchel, 1835)
Cnephasia alfacarana Razowski, 1958
Cnephasia alticolana (Herrich-Schäffer, 1851)
Cnephasia asseclana (Denis & Schiffermuller, 1775)
Cnephasia bizensis Real, 1953
Cnephasia chrysantheana (Duponchel, 1843)
Cnephasia communana (Herrich-Schäffer, 1851)
Cnephasia conspersana Douglas, 1846
Cnephasia cupressivorana (Staudinger, 1871)
Cnephasia delnoyana Groenen & Schreurs, 2012
Cnephasia ecullyana Real, 1951
Cnephasia fulturata Rebel, 1940
Cnephasia genitalana Pierce & Metcalfe, 1922
Cnephasia heinemanni Obraztsov, 1956
Cnephasia hellenica Obraztsov, 1956
Cnephasia laetana (Staudinger, 1871)
Cnephasia longana (Haworth, 1811)
Cnephasia microstrigana Razowski, 1958
Cnephasia pasiuana (Hübner, 1799)
Cnephasia sedana (Constant, 1884)
Cnephasia stephensiana (Doubleday, 1849)
Cnephasia incertana (Treitschke, 1835)
Cochylidia heydeniana (Herrich-Schäffer, 1851)
Cochylidia implicitana (Wocke, 1856)
Cochylidia moguntiana (Rossler, 1864)
Cochylidia rupicola (Curtis, 1834)
Cochylimorpha agenjoi (Razowski, 1963)
Cochylimorpha cultana (Lederer, 1855)
Cochylimorpha decolorella (Zeller, 1839)
Cochylimorpha discopunctana (Eversmann, 1844)
Cochylimorpha elongana (Fischer v. Röslerstamm, 1839)
Cochylimorpha hilarana (Herrich-Schäffer, 1851)
Cochylimorpha jucundana (Treitschke, 1835)
Cochylimorpha meridiana (Staudinger, 1859)
Cochylimorpha peucedana (Ragonot, 1889)
Cochylimorpha pyramidana (Staudinger, 1871)
Cochylimorpha salinarida Groenen & Larsen, 2003
Cochylimorpha santolinana (Staudinger, 1871)
Cochylimorpha sparsana (Staudinger, 1879)
Cochylimorpha straminea (Haworth, 1811)
Cochylis atricapitana (Stephens, 1852)
Cochylis dubitana (Hübner, 1799)
Cochylis epilinana Duponchel, 1842
Cochylis flaviciliana (Westwood, 1854)
Cochylis hybridella (Hübner, 1813)
Cochylis molliculana Zeller, 1847
Cochylis nana (Haworth, 1811)
Cochylis pallidana Zeller, 1847
Cochylis posterana Zeller, 1847
Cochylis roseana (Haworth, 1811)
Cochylis salebrana (Mann, 1862)
Commophila nevadensis Traugott-Olsen, 1990
Corticivora piniana (Herrich-Schäffer, 1851)
Crocidosema plebejana Zeller, 1847
Cydia adenocarpi (Ragonot, 1875)
Cydia amplana (Hübner, 1800)
Cydia blackmoreana (Walsingham, 1903)
Cydia conicolana (Heylaerts, 1874)
Cydia coniferana (Saxesen, 1840)
Cydia cosmophorana (Treitschke, 1835)
Cydia duplicana (Zetterstedt, 1839)
Cydia fagiglandana (Zeller, 1841)
Cydia gilviciliana (Staudinger, 1859)
Cydia ilipulana (Walsingham, 1903)
Cydia interscindana (Moschler, 1866)
Cydia intexta (Kuznetsov, 1962)
Cydia medicaginis (Kuznetsov, 1962)
Cydia microgrammana (Guenee, 1845)
Cydia nigricana (Fabricius, 1794)
Cydia oxytropidis (Martini, 1912)
Cydia pomonella (Linnaeus, 1758)
Cydia servillana (Duponchel, 1836)
Cydia splendana (Hübner, 1799)
Cydia strigulatana (Kennel, 1899)
Cydia strobilella (Linnaeus, 1758)
Cydia succedana (Denis & Schiffermuller, 1775)
Cydia ulicetana (Haworth, 1811)
Cydia vallesiaca (Sauter, 1968)
Diceratura amaranthica Razowski, 1963
Diceratura infantana (Kennel, 1899)
Diceratura ostrinana (Guenee, 1845)
Diceratura roseofasciana (Mann, 1855)
Dichrorampha acuminatana (Lienig & Zeller, 1846)
Dichrorampha alpinana (Treitschke, 1830)
Dichrorampha cacaleana (Herrich-Schäffer, 1851)
Dichrorampha chavanneana (de La Harpe, 1858)
Dichrorampha distinctana (Heinemann, 1863)
Dichrorampha eximia (Danilevsky, 1948)
Dichrorampha iberica Kuznetsov, 1978
Dichrorampha incursana (Herrich-Schäffer, 1851)
Dichrorampha letarfensis Gibeaux, 1983
Dichrorampha petiverella (Linnaeus, 1758)
Dichrorampha plumbagana (Treitschke, 1830)
Dichrorampha plumbana (Scopoli, 1763)
Dichrorampha sedatana Busck, 1906
Dichrorampha senectana Guenee, 1845
Dichrorampha simpliciana (Haworth, 1811)
Dichrorampha vancouverana McDunnough, 1935
Ditula angustiorana (Haworth, 1811)
Ditula joannisiana (Ragonot, 1888)
Eana clercana (de Joannis, 1908)
Eana cottiana (Chretien, 1898)
Eana incanana (Stephens, 1852)
Eana nervana (de Joannis, 1908)
Eana nevadensis (Schawerda, 1929)
Eana penziana (Thunberg, 1791)
Eana argentana (Clerck, 1759)
Eana osseana (Scopoli, 1763)
Eana canescana (Guenee, 1845)
Eana filipjevi (Real, 1953)
Enarmonia formosana (Scopoli, 1763)
Endothenia gentianaeana (Hübner, 1799)
Endothenia marginana (Haworth, 1811)
Endothenia nigricostana (Haworth, 1811)
Endothenia oblongana (Haworth, 1811)
Endothenia pauperculana (Staudinger, 1859)
Epagoge grotiana (Fabricius, 1781)
Epiblema cnicicolana (Zeller, 1847)
Epiblema costipunctana (Haworth, 1811)
Epiblema foenella (Linnaeus, 1758)
Epiblema graphana (Treitschke, 1835)
Epiblema hepaticana (Treitschke, 1835)
Epiblema scutulana (Denis & Schiffermuller, 1775)
Epiblema simploniana (Duponchel, 1835)
Epiblema sticticana (Fabricius, 1794)
Epichoristodes acerbella (Walker, 1864)
Epinotia abbreviana (Fabricius, 1794)
Epinotia brunnichana (Linnaeus, 1767)
Epinotia cedricida Diakonoff, 1969
Epinotia dalmatana (Rebel, 1891)
Epinotia demarniana (Fischer v. Röslerstamm, 1840)
Epinotia festivana (Hübner, 1799)
Epinotia fraternana (Haworth, 1811)
Epinotia immundana (Fischer v. Röslerstamm, 1839)
Epinotia nanana (Treitschke, 1835)
Epinotia nemorivaga (Tengstrom, 1848)
Epinotia nisella (Clerck, 1759)
Epinotia obraztsovi Agenjo, 1966
Epinotia ramella (Linnaeus, 1758)
Epinotia rubiginosana (Herrich-Schäffer, 1851)
Epinotia solandriana (Linnaeus, 1758)
Epinotia subocellana (Donovan, 1806)
Epinotia subsequana (Haworth, 1811)
Epinotia tenerana (Denis & Schiffermuller, 1775)
Epinotia tetraquetrana (Haworth, 1811)
Epinotia thapsiana (Zeller, 1847)
Eucosma aemulana (Schlager, 1849)
Eucosma albarracina Hartig, 1941
Eucosma albidulana (Herrich-Schäffer, 1851)
Eucosma albuneana (Zeller, 1847)
Eucosma aspidiscana (Hübner, 1817)
Eucosma cana (Haworth, 1811)
Eucosma conterminana (Guenee, 1845)
Eucosma cretaceana (Kennel, 1899)
Eucosma cumulana (Guenee, 1845)
Eucosma gonzalezalvarezi Agenjo, 1969
Eucosma hohenwartiana (Denis & Schiffermuller, 1775)
Eucosma lacteana (Treitschke, 1835)
Eucosma obumbratana (Lienig & Zeller, 1846)
Eucosma pupillana (Clerck, 1759)
Eucosma rubescana (Constant, 1895)
Eucosma sublucidana (Kennel, 1901)
Eucosma urbana (Kennel, 1901)
Eudemis profundana (Denis & Schiffermuller, 1775)
Eugnosta lathoniana (Hübner, 1800)
Eugnosta magnificana (Rebel, 1914)
Eulia ministrana (Linnaeus, 1758)
Eupoecilia ambiguella (Hübner, 1796)
Eupoecilia angustana (Hübner, 1799)
Exapate duratella Heyden, 1864
Falseuncaria ruficiliana (Haworth, 1811)
Fulvoclysia nerminae Kocak, 1982
Grapholita funebrana Treitschke, 1835
Grapholita janthinana (Duponchel, 1843)
Grapholita molesta (Busck, 1916)
Grapholita tenebrosana Duponchel, 1843
Grapholita caecana Schlager, 1847
Grapholita compositella (Fabricius, 1775)
Grapholita coronillana Lienig & Zeller, 1846
Grapholita fissana (Frolich, 1828)
Grapholita gemmiferana Treitschke, 1835
Grapholita internana (Guenee, 1845)
Grapholita lunulana (Denis & Schiffermuller, 1775)
Grapholita nebritana Treitschke, 1830
Grapholita orobana Treitschke, 1830
Gravitarmata margarotana (Heinemann, 1863)
Gynnidomorpha alismana (Ragonot, 1883)
Gynnidomorpha luridana (Gregson, 1870)
Gynnidomorpha permixtana (Denis & Schiffermuller, 1775)
Gynnidomorpha rubricana (Peyerimhoff, 1877)
Gynnidomorpha vectisana (Humphreys & Westwood, 1845)
Gypsonoma aceriana (Duponchel, 1843)
Gypsonoma dealbana (Frolich, 1828)
Gypsonoma gymnesiarum Rebel, 1934
Gypsonoma minutana (Hübner, 1799)
Gypsonoma oppressana (Treitschke, 1835)
Hedya dimidiana (Clerck, 1759)
Hedya nubiferana (Haworth, 1811)
Hedya ochroleucana (Frolich, 1828)
Hedya pruniana (Hübner, 1799)
Hedya salicella (Linnaeus, 1758)
Hysterophora maculosana (Haworth, 1811)
Isotrias cuencana (Kennel, 1899)
Isotrias hybridana (Hübner, 1817)
Isotrias penedana Trematerra, 2013
Isotrias stramentana (Guenee, 1845)
Lathronympha balearici Diakonoff, 1972
Lathronympha strigana (Fabricius, 1775)
Lobesia artemisiana (Zeller, 1847)
Lobesia bicinctana (Duponchel, 1844)
Lobesia botrana (Denis & Schiffermuller, 1775)
Lobesia helichrysana (Ragonot, 1879)
Lobesia indusiana (Zeller, 1847)
Lobesia limoniana (Milliere, 1860)
Lobesia littoralis (Westwood & Humphreys, 1845)
Lobesia porrectana (Zeller, 1847)
Lobesia quaggana Mann, 1855
Lobesia reliquana (Hübner, 1825)
Lozotaenia cupidinana (Staudinger, 1859)
Lozotaenia forsterana (Fabricius, 1781)
Lozotaenia mabilliana (Ragonot, 1875)
Lozotaeniodes cupressana (Duponchel, 1836)
Lozotaeniodes formosana (Frolich, 1830)
Metendothenia atropunctana (Zetterstedt, 1839)
Neosphaleroptera nubilana (Hübner, 1799)
Notocelia cynosbatella (Linnaeus, 1758)
Notocelia incarnatana (Hübner, 1800)
Notocelia roborana (Denis & Schiffermuller, 1775)
Notocelia rosaecolana (Doubleday, 1850)
Notocelia trimaculana (Haworth, 1811)
Notocelia uddmanniana (Linnaeus, 1758)
Olethreutes arcuella (Clerck, 1759)
Olindia schumacherana (Fabricius, 1787)
Orthotaenia undulana (Denis & Schiffermuller, 1775)
Oxypteron exiguana (de La Harpe, 1860)
Oxypteron polita (Walsingham, 1907)
Oxypteron schawerdai (Rebel, 1936)
Pammene albuginana (Guenee, 1845)
Pammene amygdalana (Duponchel, 1842)
Pammene argyrana (Hübner, 1799)
Pammene aurana (Fabricius, 1775)
Pammene cocciferana Walsingham, 1903
Pammene fasciana (Linnaeus, 1761)
Pammene juniperana (Milliere, 1858)
Pammene luedersiana (Sorhagen, 1885)
Pammene obscurana (Stephens, 1834)
Pammene populana (Fabricius, 1787)
Pammene salvana (Staudinger, 1859)
Pammene spiniana (Duponchel, 1843)
Pammene splendidulana (Guenee, 1845)
Pammene suspectana (Lienig & Zeller, 1846)
Pandemis cerasana (Hübner, 1786)
Pandemis cinnamomeana (Treitschke, 1830)
Pandemis corylana (Fabricius, 1794)
Pandemis dumetana (Treitschke, 1835)
Pandemis heparana (Denis & Schiffermuller, 1775)
Paramesia alhamana (A. Schmidt, 1933)
Paramesia gnomana (Clerck, 1759)
Pelatea klugiana (Freyer, 1836)
Pelochrista bleuseana (Oberthur, 1888)
Pelochrista caecimaculana (Hübner, 1799)
Pelochrista decolorana (Freyer, 1842)
Pelochrista fusculana (Zeller, 1847)
Pelochrista griseolana (Zeller, 1847)
Pelochrista infidana (Hübner, 1824)
Pelochrista modicana (Zeller, 1847)
Pelochrista mollitana (Zeller, 1847)
Pelochrista obscura Kuznetsov, 1978
Pelochrista sordicomana (Staudinger, 1859)
Pelochrista turiana (Zerny, 1927)
Periclepsis cinctana (Denis & Schiffermuller, 1775)
Phalonidia affinitana (Douglas, 1846)
Phalonidia albipalpana (Zeller, 1847)
Phalonidia contractana (Zeller, 1847)
Phalonidia gilvicomana (Zeller, 1847)
Phalonidia manniana (Fischer v. Röslerstamm, 1839)
Phaneta pauperana (Duponchel, 1843)
Phiaris micana (Denis & Schiffermuller, 1775)
Phiaris predotai (Hartig, 1938)
Phiaris umbrosana (Freyer, 1842)
Philedone gerningana (Denis & Schiffermuller, 1775)
Philedonides seeboldiana (Rossler, 1877)
Phtheochroa cymatodana (Rebel, 1927)
Phtheochroa duponchelana (Duponchel, 1843)
Phtheochroa ecballiella Huemer, 1990
Phtheochroa frigidana (Guenee, 1845)
Phtheochroa gracillimana (Rebel, 1910)
Phtheochroa inopiana (Haworth, 1811)
Phtheochroa ochrobasana (Chretien, 1915)
Phtheochroa rectangulana (Chretien, 1915)
Phtheochroa rugosana (Hübner, 1799)
Phtheochroa schreibersiana (Frolich, 1828)
Phtheochroa simoniana (Staudinger, 1859)
Phtheochroa syrtana Ragonot, 1888
Piniphila bifasciana (Haworth, 1811)
Pristerognatha fuligana (Denis & Schiffermuller, 1775)
Propiromorpha rhodophana (Herrich-Schäffer, 1851)
Pseudargyrotoza conwagana (Fabricius, 1775)
Pseudococcyx mughiana (Zeller, 1868)
Pseudococcyx posticana (Zetterstedt, 1839)
Pseudococcyx tessulatana (Staudinger, 1871)
Pseudococcyx turionella (Linnaeus, 1758)
Ptycholoma lecheana (Linnaeus, 1758)
Ptycholomoides aeriferana (Herrich-Schäffer, 1851)
Retinia resinella (Linnaeus, 1758)
Rhopobota naevana (Hübner, 1817)
Rhopobota stagnana (Denis & Schiffermuller, 1775)
Rhyacionia buoliana (Denis & Schiffermuller, 1775)
Rhyacionia duplana (Hübner, 1813)
Rhyacionia maritimana Prose, 1981
Rhyacionia pinicolana (Doubleday, 1849)
Rhyacionia pinivorana (Lienig & Zeller, 1846)
Selania capparidana (Zeller, 1847)
Selania leplastriana (Curtis, 1831)
Selania resedana (Obraztsov, 1959)
Selenodes karelica (Tengstrom, 1875)
Sparganothis pilleriana (Denis & Schiffermuller, 1775)
Spatalistis bifasciana (Hübner, 1787)
Sphaleroptera alpicolana (Frolich, 1830)
Spilonota ocellana (Denis & Schiffermuller, 1775)
Syndemis musculana (Hübner, 1799)
Thiodia citrana (Hübner, 1799)
Thiodia couleruana (Duponchel, 1834)
Thiodia lerneana (Treitschke, 1835)
Thiodia trochilana (Frolich, 1828)
Thiodiodes seeboldi (Rossler, 1877)
Tortricodes alternella (Denis & Schiffermuller, 1775)
Tortrix viridana Linnaeus, 1758
Xerocnephasia rigana (Sodoffsky, 1829)
Zeiraphera griseana (Hübner, 1799)
Zeiraphera isertana (Fabricius, 1794)

Yponomeutidae
Banghaasia ildefonsella Friese, 1960
Cedestis gysseleniella Zeller, 1839
Cedestis subfasciella (Stephens, 1834)
Kessleria fasciapennella (Stainton, 1849)
Kessleria saxifragae (Stainton, 1868)
Kessleria brachypterella Huemer & Tarmann, 1992
Kessleria brevicornuta Huemer & Tarmann, 1992
Kessleria diabolica Huemer & Tarmann, 1992
Ocnerostoma friesei Svensson, 1966
Ocnerostoma piniariella Zeller, 1847
Paradoxus osyridellus Stainton, 1869
Parahyponomeuta egregiella (Duponchel, 1839)
Paraswammerdamia albicapitella (Scharfenberg, 1805)
Paraswammerdamia nebulella (Goeze, 1783)
Pseudoswammerdamia combinella (Hübner, 1786)
Scythropia crataegella (Linnaeus, 1767)
Swammerdamia caesiella (Hübner, 1796)
Swammerdamia compunctella Herrich-Schäffer, 1855
Swammerdamia pyrella (Villers, 1789)
Yponomeuta cagnagella (Hübner, 1813)
Yponomeuta evonymella (Linnaeus, 1758)
Yponomeuta malinellus Zeller, 1838
Yponomeuta padella (Linnaeus, 1758)
Yponomeuta plumbella (Denis & Schiffermuller, 1775)
Yponomeuta rorrella (Hübner, 1796)
Yponomeuta sedella Treitschke, 1832
Zelleria hepariella Stainton, 1849
Zelleria oleastrella (Milliere, 1864)
Zelleria plumbeella Staudinger, 1871

Ypsolophidae
Ochsenheimeria bubalella (Hübner, 1813)
Ochsenheimeria taurella (Denis & Schiffermuller, 1775)
Ochsenheimeria vacculella Fischer von Röslerstamm, 1842
Phrealcia eximiella (Rebel, 1899)
Ypsolopha asperella (Linnaeus, 1761)
Ypsolopha blandella (Christoph, 1882)
Ypsolopha cajaliella Vives, 2003
Ypsolopha dentella (Fabricius, 1775)
Ypsolopha excisella (Lederer, 1855)
Ypsolopha fractella (Chretien, 1915)
Ypsolopha horridella (Treitschke, 1835)
Ypsolopha instabilella (Mann, 1866)
Ypsolopha lucella (Fabricius, 1775)
Ypsolopha mucronella (Scopoli, 1763)
Ypsolopha nemorella (Linnaeus, 1758)
Ypsolopha parenthesella (Linnaeus, 1761)
Ypsolopha persicella (Fabricius, 1787)
Ypsolopha scabrella (Linnaeus, 1761)
Ypsolopha sequella (Clerck, 1759)
Ypsolopha sylvella (Linnaeus, 1767)
Ypsolopha trichonella (Mann, 1861)
Ypsolopha ustella (Clerck, 1759)
Ypsolopha vittella (Linnaeus, 1758)

Zygaenidae
Adscita geryon (Hübner, 1813)
Adscita jordani (Naufock, 1921)
Adscita schmidti (Naufock, 1933)
Adscita statices (Linnaeus, 1758)
Adscita bolivari (Agenjo, 1937)
Adscita mannii (Lederer, 1853)
Aglaope infausta (Linnaeus, 1767)
Jordanita hispanica (Alberti, 1937)
Jordanita globulariae (Hübner, 1793)
Jordanita vartianae (Malicky, 1961)
Jordanita subsolana (Staudinger, 1862)
Jordanita budensis (Ad. & Au. Speyer, 1858)
Jordanita notata (Zeller, 1847)
Rhagades pruni (Denis & Schiffermuller, 1775)
Rhagades predotae (Naufock, 1930)
Zygaena carniolica (Scopoli, 1763)
Zygaena fausta (Linnaeus, 1767)
Zygaena hilaris Ochsenheimer, 1808
Zygaena occitanica (Villers, 1789)
Zygaena contaminei Boisduval, 1834
Zygaena purpuralis (Brunnich, 1763)
Zygaena sarpedon (Hübner, 1790)
Zygaena anthyllidis Boisduval, 1828
Zygaena ephialtes (Linnaeus, 1767)
Zygaena exulans (Hohenwarth, 1792)
Zygaena filipendulae (Linnaeus, 1758)
Zygaena ignifera Korb, 1897
Zygaena lavandulae (Esper, 1783)
Zygaena lonicerae (Scheven, 1777)
Zygaena loti (Denis & Schiffermuller, 1775)
Zygaena nevadensis Rambur, 1858
Zygaena osterodensis Reiss, 1921
Zygaena rhadamanthus (Esper, 1789)
Zygaena romeo Duponchel, 1835
Zygaena transalpina (Esper, 1780)
Zygaena trifolii (Esper, 1783)
Zygaena viciae (Denis & Schiffermuller, 1775)

See also
List of Iberian butterflies

External links
Fauna Europaea

Iberia
Iberia P
Moths
Moths
Moths